WLKT (channel 62) was a short-lived independent television station in Lexington, Kentucky, United States. The station was owned by Family Broadcasting Company, Inc., a subsidiary of Family Group Broadcasting. WLKT-TV's transmitter was located in Clark County in an area near Winchester. This station was not and is not in any way related to WLKT-FM, the Mainstream Top 40 radio station in Lexington.

History
The original occupant of the channel 62 allocation in Lexington was ABC affiliate WTVQ-TV. In 1980, WTVQ relocated to channel 36 to address signal concerns in parts of central Kentucky, a decision that left channel 62 open for assignment to a new television station. By 1982, four different groups had applied to start a new station on the channel: Kentucky Educational Television, seeking to start a second service; nonprofit Way of the Cross Outreach, Inc. (WOC); Family Broadcasting Corporation (FBC), which owned WFTS-TV in Tampa, Florida; and Lexington Family Television, Inc. Facing funding problems, KET dropped out before hearings began, followed by Lexington Family Television, which settled with Way of the Cross.

The initial decision of the Federal Communications Commission (FCC) in February 1983 favored Way of the Cross, but the commission's review board then awarded the construction permit to FBC in October, finding its proposal technically superior. Way of the Cross appealed. Litigation continued until June 1986, when the two groups reached a settlement in which Way of the Cross would become a part-owner of FBC's station and receive 15 hours of airtime a week for religious programming.

With the coast clear for FBC to build, however, attention shifted to tower site problems. Twice, FBC was denied by the Urban County Board of Adjustment in its bid to place the tower, and a third site on land deeded to the University of Kentucky was also controversial among local residents and denied. WLKT finally came to air on October 15, 1988, from a tower in Clark County and studios on New Circle Road Northeast. The protracted license fight had cost the station before it even started broadcasting: in 1986, WDKY-TV (channel 56) had signed on the air and beaten channel 62 to being the first independent to market.

The relationship with Way of the Cross did not last a month after sign-on before breaking down. On November 15, Way of the Cross sued FBC, claiming it had reneged on the airtime agreement, which supplied the ministry an hour at 9 a.m. and midnight, despite supplying the programs to be broadcast. The station secretly bid on the ABC affiliation when the network considered leaving WTVQ, but it opted to stay with its existing outlet. 

In June 1989, WLKT let go of three station executives, including its general manager, in what was described as little more than a cost-cutting move. However, the station's financial troubles would end up claiming it. Channel 62 suspended operations at 4:30 p.m. on the afternoon of June 30, following an episode of Alvin and the Chipmunks. Staff were told of the move just 20 minutes before it happened. Insufficient financial backing dominated the reasons for the station's folding; a division of Raymond James and Associates, which held a 49 percent stake, was already looking for buyers for WLKT and two other Family Group-owned stations, and it had sued Wheeler, claiming that he inflated projected revenues for the station despite knowing it would not be sustainable in the Lexington market and had the company purchase equipment from his other stations at inflated prices.

On May 9, 1990, the station surrendered its license. Nine days later, FBC filed for Chapter 7 bankruptcy, owing more than $1.3 million to a group of creditors headlined by program suppliers Viacom and Lorimar-Telepictures. The company claimed that the Way of the Cross lawsuit scared away potential buyers.

See also
WBLU-LP – third and final occupant of UHF channel 62 in the Lexington area

References

   
   

LKT-TV
Television channels and stations established in 1988
Television channels and stations disestablished in 1989
1988 establishments in Kentucky
1989 disestablishments in Kentucky
Defunct television stations in the United States
LKT-TV